Pierrot the Prodigal (Italian: Histoire d'un Pierrot) is a 1914 Italian silent film directed by Baldassarre Negroni and starring Francesca Bertini, Leda Gys and Emilio Ghione.

Cast
 Francesca Bertini as Pierrot  
 Leda Gys as Louisette  
 Emilio Ghione as Pochinet  
 Elvira Radaelli as Fifine  
 Amedeo Ciaffi as Julot  
 Ninne as A Child

References

Bibliography 
 Moliterno, Gino. The A to Z of Italian Cinema. Scarecrow Press, 2009.

External links 
 

1914 films
1930s Italian-language films
Italian silent films
Films directed by Baldassarre Negroni
Italian black-and-white films